Yun Bai (born 1979) is an American neo-feminist pop artist and painter who is famous for her work with mixed mediums, including porn magazines, ping pong balls, machetes, and traditional fine arts mediums such as oil paint and watercolor. Bai is alternatively known as "YunnyBunny." In her work, she explores themes of identity, social stimulus, fascination with science, feminine comment, sarcasm/mockery, and influence from urban culture.

Bai self-represents and is also represented by New Gallery (Houston).

Early life and education 
Born in Beijing, China, Bai migrated to the United States when she was age 6. Bai was raised in the deep South; she lived in Tallahassee, Florida, for 12 years until she was awarded an achievement scholarship of $28,000 from August 1997 to May 2001 to pursue a degree at Agnes Scott College, a private, liberal arts women's college in Atlanta, Georgia. In May 2001, Bai graduated with a bachelor's degree in studio art (painting) from Agnes Scott College.

During Bai's college years, her mother was diagnosed with cancer, and her parents filed for bankruptcy; as a result, she worked as an exotic dancer to pay for the rest of her undergraduate education.

Career 
As a contemporary feminist artist, Bai works with explicit materials to create messages of female empowerment in her work.

Bai was a guest speaker at a lecture at Georgia State University in Atlanta, Georgia, in June 2003. She also participated as a panelist at the Atlanta Contemporary Art Center in June 2003.

Her work has been a part of King & Spalding Collection and AGL Resources Collection in Atlanta, Georgia since July 2003. Her work appeared in the Pacific Edition of New American Paintings in December 2006.

Bai's work was added to the Tyler Perry Studios Collection in January 2013, print department of Los Angeles County Museum of Art in November 2012, permanent collection of Laguna Art Museum/Orange County Art Museum in 2012, permanent collection of the National Museum of Mexican Art in November 2012, Huntington Museum of University of Texas at Austin in November 2012, University of California, Santa Barbara Library in November 2012, Self Help Graphics & Art Collection in November and October 2012, Galaria Sin Fronteras (Austin, Texas) in November 2012, Gerald Buck Collections in November 2012.

Recognition 
In 2015, Bai was noted in Oyster Magazine, Ms. magazine, and BWW News Desk for her work in the #YesAllWomen Benefit at the East Los Angeles Women's Center.

Bai was a finalist for the Artadia grant in Atlanta, Georgia in October 2011.

Bai was named one of "Top 10 Emerging Artists by LA Weekly in January 2006. Bai was recognized by The Atlanta Journal-Constitution, Art Papers magazine, ArtAsiaPacific, World Journal, and The Wall Street Journal in December 2007, as well as on the cover of The London Magazine (UK's oldest literary publication est. 1732) in April/May 2012. ARTSPROJEKT selected Bai to be amongst their cache of artists on their international merchandising platform in 2010.

Selected works 
The following are short descriptions of a few selected Bai's projects and series. Not described here include her Cellnoid project and numerous exhibitions.

Porn Flower Series 
One of her most well-known works is her series of Porn Flowers—a collection of paintings that use pornography magazines to generate unassuming images of flowers. Drawing her inspiration from working in the adult entertainment industry, critics note that the crude nature of the pornography and erotic imagery are imperceptible, and the flowers appear innocent and charming. In this series, Bai wishes to express her sentiment that "all women are flowers." In this statement, she expresses that beautiful things can manifest from situations that appear difficult to many.

Nipple Secret Project 
In intimate person-to-person interactions, friends and Bai indulge their secrets. As a mock science experiment, women are asked "If you could only represent yourself through your nipple, how would you do it?" Bai considers this project to be a basic, scientific experiment in which the stimuli were the questions, the control group were the nine women ranging from 23 to 45 years old, and the resulting pattern of responses was one possible outcome. The women were asked to share one secret and decorate their nipples as a form of self representation. Some allowed the artist to share enlarged images of their exposed nipples for exhibition.

Comfort Colors Series 
In this series, Bai explicitly points to the first five years of a child's life as vital in the development of character and interests, preferences and curiosities. To Bai, The first five years of her life was spent in Beijing was a time of discovery, innocence, and playfulness. Bai intends to focus the series on Bai's childhood memories and emotional associations with her comfort colors.

Fusion Series 
Bai's artist statement shared that Chaos, Order, Fusion, and Existence are abstract paintings reflective of elements in structure which counteract and stabilize chaotic occurrences.

Exhibitions 
Bai was involved in many exhibitions and exhibited with many artists. In 2004, she had her first international show at Berlin's Gallery 24 and relocated to Los Angeles. She was chosen as one of 30 international artists invited to participate in the Chinese Biennial at the Ku Art Center in Beijing, China in 2008.

Solo/two-person

Selected group

Additional content 
 What is a Porn Flower? Who is Yun Bai?
 Big Booty Flower
 LinkedIn Posts

References 

1979 births
Chinese emigrants to the United States
American artists
Living people
Artists from Beijing